Anadara notabilis, or the Eared ark clam, is a clam in the family Arcidae. It can be found in Caribbean waters, ranging from Florida to Bermuda and Brazil.

References

notabilis
Bivalves described in 1798